Battle of Bhalubang was fought on 13 October 2003 in Bhalubang, Nepal, between the Kingdom of Nepal and the Communist Party of Nepal (Maoist), as the current Communist Party of Nepal (Maoist Centre) was known at the time. It resulted in the government victory and about 40 soldiers died from both sides.

References 

Conflicts in 2003
2003 in Nepal
Maoism in Nepal
Wars involving Nepal
Battles of the Nepalese Civil War

Battles in 2003
October 2003 events in Asia